Guðbergur Bergsson is an Icelandic writer born in Grindavík on 16 October 1932. He attended the University of Iceland for his Teaching degree and then studied literature at the University of Barcelona. He is one of the leading translators of Spanish works in Iceland. In Barcelona, he met and engaged with the publisher and writer Jaime Salinas Bonmatí.

His first book came out in 1961. He has had twenty books in all including poetry and children's literature. He has won the Icelandic Literary Prize twice. In 2004, he won the Swedish Academy Nordic Prize, known as the 'little Nobel'.

Works
 Músin sem læðist, 1961
 Tómas Jónsson, metsölubók (1966). Translated by Lytton Smith as Tómas Jónsson, Bestseller (Open Letter, 2017).
 Ástir samlyndra hjóna, 1967
 Anna, 1968
 Það sefur í djúpinu, 1973
 Hermann og Dídí, 1974
 Það rís úr djúpinu, 1976
 Saga af manni sem fékk flugu í höfuðið, 1979
 Sagan af Ara Fróðasyni og Hugborgu konu hans, 1980
 Hjartað býr enn í helli sínum, 1982
 Leitin að landinu fagra, 1985
 Froskmaðurinn, 1985 
 Svanurinn (1991). Translated by Bernard Scudder as The Swan (Mare's Nest, 1997).
 Sú kvalda ást sem hugarfylgsnin geyma, 1993
 Ævinlega, 1994
 Lömuðu kennslukonurnar, 2004
 Leitin að barninu í gjánni - Barnasaga ekki ætluð börnum", 2008
 Missir, 2010
 Hin eilífa þrá, 2012
 Þrír sneru aftur, 2014

 Adaptation 
In 2017, the Icelandic film director Ása Helga Hjörleifsdóttir shot her first movie , the adaptation of the Svanurinn.References

Further reading

 Birna Bjarnadóttir, Recesses of the Mind: Aesthetics in the Work of Guðbergur Bergsson'' (Montreal and Kingston: McGill-Queen's University Press, 2012)

Icelandic male writers
Icelandic translators
Bergsson, Gudbergur
Bergsson, Gudbergur
University of Barcelona alumni
Icelandic LGBT writers
Gay writers
20th-century Icelandic novelists
20th-century male writers
20th-century translators
21st-century Icelandic novelists
21st-century male writers
21st-century translators
Male novelists